HD 195019 b is an exoplanet orbiting around HD 195019 in the binary star system. It has a minimum mass of 3.7 MJ. It orbits very close to the star. Like many planets at close distance, its orbit is circular, even more circular or less eccentric than Earth. It takes 437 hours to orbit with velocity of 83.24 kilometers per second.

References

External links
 

Exoplanets discovered in 1998
Giant planets
Delphinus (constellation)
Exoplanets detected by radial velocity